Todd Stanger Clever (born January 16, 1983) is an American retired rugby union player. He became the first American to play Super Rugby. At the international level, he was a member of the United States national team, served as captain, and is the most capped player in United States rugby union history.

Early life and education 
Clever was born on January 16, 1983, in Palm Springs, California. He grew up in San Jose, California and attended Santa Teresa High School. He attended college at the University of Nevada, Reno and played for the club rugby team, where he was named a three-time collegiate All-American (2002–04).

Club rugby career

National Provincial Championship 
Clever began his professional career in New Zealand in 2006 when he joined North Harbour in the National Provincial Championship.

Super Rugby 
He played with the South African Lions franchise in the 2009 Super 14. Clever is the first American player to ever play in the Super 14 and scored the first try for an American in Super 14 against the Hurricanes on March 28, 2009. Clever played for the Lions against the British & Irish Lions.

Top League 
Clever joined Suntory of Japan in June 2010. In March 2012 Clever and Suntory won the Japan Top League final over Panasonic. He then went on to play for the BGC APBs which won the 2012 Hong Kong 10s tournament. In March 2012 Clever signed a contract with NTT Communications Shining Arcs another Top League club. He confirmed that he would be leaving the Shining Arcs after the 2015 season to rejoin his former club OMBAC to compete in the 2015 Pacific Rugby Premiership.

English Premiership 
On September 17, 2015, Clever moved to England to join top professional club Newcastle Falcons in the Aviva Premiership for the 2015–16 season. He played one season for the Falcons, earning 6 caps.

Major League Rugby 

In 2016, Clever signed on as both a co-owner and player for Austin Elite Rugby, an independent newly-professional club and one of the founding members of Major League Rugby, launched in 2018.

Pacific Rugby Premiership 

In 2017, Clever won a PRP Title with Old Mission Beach Athletic Club RFC.

Austin Huns: 2017 USA D1 Club National Championship 

In May and June 2017, Todd Clever played with the Austin Huns Rugby Football Club and assisted the Austin Huns in winning their first D1 Club National Championship with a 27 - 23 victory over the New York Athletic Club on June 3.

International rugby career

Youth internationals 
Clever was introduced to the United States setup in July 2000 when he joined the U19 national team for their Australian tour. He was named to the team for the 2002 IRB FIRA/AER Junior World Championships in February 2002, with his last appearance for the U19's coming in their loss to Spain.

USA Eagles 
Clever made his international debut against  in August 2003, at the age of 20. Clever played for the US during the 2007 Rugby World Cup, where he intercepted a pass against South Africa that led to Takudzwa Ngwenya scoring the try of the 2007 World Cup.

Among other accolades, Clever was named the 2008 USA Rugby Men's Player of the Year by World Rugby Shop. Clever played in the 2009 Churchill Cup that saw the Eagles clinch the Bowl by beating Georgia.  Clever further led the Eagles to success in 2009 by beating Uruguay in a home-and-away series to clinch a berth into the 2011 Rugby World Cup. Clever captained the team during the 2011 Rugby World Cup, starting three matches.

He was chosen as the North American Player of the Decade and the Ruggamatrix USA Player of the Decade for 2000–2009. For many years Clever was the captain and face of the United States national team.

On July 19, 2015, one day after a loss to Samoa in the Pacific Nations Cup, USA Rugby announced that Todd Clever was released from the Eagles roster due to "multiple squad conduct violations." After the Eagles finished their World Cup campaign, Clever published a letter explaining his version of the events. He claims that he had received permission to attend the ESPY awards show with Scott Lavalla as long as they were back and ready to train the following day. However the schedule was altered when Clever and Lavalla had left and they both missed an early morning gym session. Lavalla was dropped to the bench and Clever was dropped from the match day squad for their upcoming PNC match. Following this incident Clever also missed a morning jogging session, and this prompted Tolkin to kick Clever off the team. Tolkin did not recall Clever to the World Cup squad. Instead Clever spent a week training with the Barbarians F.C. Originally Clever was going to retire following the 2015 World Cup, but this incident motivated Clever to continue playing professional rugby.

Following poor results at the 2015 Rugby World Cup, USA Rugby parted ways with Mike Tolkin.  Newly appointed head coach John Mitchell reintegrated Clever with the team immediately as well as reinstating him as captain of the squad.  He became the most capped player in United States history on June 25, 2016, in the United States' 2016 mid-year rugby union internationals match against Russia.

On June 21, Clever announced his international retirement and his last game was the Eagles 52–16 win over Canada which caused the United States to qualify for the 2019 Rugby World Cup as Americas 1.

USA Sevens 
Clever has also played for the US national rugby sevens team. In late 2009, Clever scored what was deemed the try of the day in George.  In the final match of the day for the US against Scotland, Clever leaped over an injured player and physio and glided into the try zone for a consolation try.

Personal life 
Clever was featured in ESPN The Magazine'''s 2015 The Body Issue'' and was the first rugby player in the edition's history.

On August 31, 2020 he announced his engagement to Maya Stojan on various social media.

Training 
Over his career, Clever's training has included lower body and rotational power, foundational based lower body strength training to improve force production and attempt to lower risk of injuries, and rugby-specific Energy System Development.

Awards and honors 
 
U-19 National Team Member (2000–2002)
3-time College All-American (2002–2004)
USA Eagles (7s)
USA Eagles (XVs)
Captain USA Eagles (XVs)
First American to play in the Super 14
First American to score a try in the Super 14
2006 ARN Player of the Year
2008 USA Rugby Men's Player of the Year
2009 RUGBYMag.com Player of the Year
2009 RUGBYMag.com Overseas Performer of the Year 
North American Rugby Player of the Decade 2000–2009
RuggaMatrix USA Player of the Decade 2000–2009

International tries

See also 
 United States national rugby union team
 United States national rugby sevens team

References

External links 

 USA Rugby player profile
 Newcastle Falcons player profile
 

American rugby union players
1983 births
Living people
Sportspeople from Palm Springs, California
Sportspeople from San Diego
Sportspeople from San Jose, California
Golden Lions players
Lions (United Rugby Championship) players
North Harbour rugby union players
Rugby union flankers
Tokyo Sungoliath players
Urayasu D-Rocks players
University of Nevada, Reno alumni
United States international rugby union players
American expatriate rugby union players
Expatriate rugby union players in New Zealand
Expatriate rugby union players in Japan
Expatriate rugby union players in South Africa
American expatriate sportspeople in New Zealand
American expatriate sportspeople in Japan
American expatriate sportspeople in South Africa
United States international rugby sevens players
Santa Teresa High School alumni
Austin Gilgronis players
Newcastle Falcons players